Anna Katharina Schmid (born 12 December 1989) is a Swiss pole vaulter. She won the bronze medal at the 2007 European Junior Championships.

Her personal bests in the event are 4.45 metres outdoors (Basel 2011) and 4.42 metres indoors (Magglingen 2012).

Achievements

Notes

References

External links 
 

1989 births
Living people
Swiss female pole vaulters